Oleg Yurevich Mavromati (also known as Mavromatti; born February 5, 1965, Volgograd) is a Russian artist-actionist  and a filmmaker.

Biography 
Born February, 5th 1965 in Volgograd, USSR.

1984 graduates from the Volgograd medical school № 3. From 1985 to 1989 is a leader of the art collective «The Dance of the Giraffe» («Танец жирафа»). From 1987 to 1990 he was an editor of the punk-journal «No Future» («Будущего нет»). From 1988 to 1990 he was a front-man of the  punk bands «Schnook» («ЧМО») and «Manifesto Committee» («Комитет Манифест»). Between 1990-1991 he took part in the art movement «Expropriation of the Territory of Art» («ЭТИ») together with Anatoly Osmolovsky, Dmitry Pimenov, Grigori Gusarov. From 1993 to 1994 he participated in the art collective Neceziudik («Нецезиудик») together with Alexander Brener,  Anatoly Osmolovsky, Dmitry Pimenov, Sendi Revizorov, Alexander Zubarzuk. In 1995, together with the artists Farid Bogdalov, Mavromatti established the art collective «Absolute Love Sect» members of which were also Imperator Wawa, Dmitry Pimenov, Mihail and Tatyana Nikitin, Alena Martynova.

The Film Union SUPERNOVA within which Mavromatti has been producing his movies was established by him and Sergej Salnikov in 1995. Other members until 2000 were Sergej Pahomov, Svetlana Baskova, Alexander Maslaev and others. Since 2000 SUPERNOVA productions have been made in Bulgaria and USA, together with artist Boryana Rossa.

In 2004 Oleg Mavrmatti and Boryana Rossa established ULTRAFUTURO art collective. Other members are Anton Terziev, Katia Damianova and Miroslav Dimitrov. The group had made more than 60 performances and public interventions. The work of the group address  issues of technology, science and their social and political implications. Works by ULTRAFUTURO were shown at venues such as the Biennial for Electronic Art, Perth (BEAP); Society for Art and Technology (SAT), Montreal; Art Digital at the 2nd Moscow Biennial; Center for Biotechnology and Interdisciplinary Studies, Rensselaer Polytechnic Institute, Troy, NY; MUMOK, Viena; Zacheta Gallery, Warsaw; RIAP Performance art festival Quebec, Stedelijk Museum, Amsterdam; Schenectady Museum, NY and are included in the respected selection Transitland Video Art from central and Eastern Europe 1989-2009. Rossa and Mavromatti perform also as ULTRAFUTURO in Trickster Theatre, Exit Art,  NY since 2006.

On April 1, 2000 at the yard of the  Institute of Cultorology in Moscow, Mavromatti shoot a scene of his film «Oil on Canvas». He was a director and an actor in one of the leading roles. The script involved a scene of crucifixion, which later appeared to be controversial for particular fundamentalist formations in the Orthodox Christian Church in Russia.

The story  of the film is based on the biography of the young Ukrainian painter Oleg Golosiy, who according to the legend was killed by his best friend. This friend was also an artist, and he committed this crime because of envy. 
Mavromatti developed the story and added another psychological layer of the character who killed Golosiy. Mavromatti' himself played the role of the killer. According to the script the character repented and in order to prove his sincerity he chose to change the traditional artistic medium he used (paint and canvas) with direct action and physical expression. As a true evidence of his repent the character decided to crucify himself representing an archetype of sacrifice, pain and humiliation. 
The place where the scene was shot was strategically chosen to be in between the Institute of Cultorology and the temple Christ the Savior. The performance within the film was called «Do Not Believe Your Eyes» and was also meant to address the  institutionalization of artistic expression,  the commercialization in art and the compromise artists often make with their sincerity, for the sake of money and fame.

Several weeks after there was a legal complaint from the chairman of the local Orthodox church community «St. Nikola», a neighbour of the Institute of Culturology and members of the party Russian National Unity against Mavromatti, which was sent back by the Moscow City court, as there was no evidence of crime. Later the same complaint with the help of powerful connections was sent to the General Attorney's Office. Mavromatti's home was searched on 07.07.2000 and all his video and film materials were confiscated. The film “Oil on Canvas” was never finished.  Mavromatti was interrogated three times in the special Department of National Religious Matters, by Yurii Krilov. He is persecuted under the article 282 of the Russian Criminal Codex, for «inciting religious animosity» like many other contemporary artists and cultural producers in Russia.   Mavromatti is  facing 3–5 years of prison.

The only remain from the scene is a video tape which was shot separately from the film footage. Later this video became well known  as a performance under the name «Do Not Believe Your Eyes!» It was shown internationally at places such as The Museum of Contemporary Art, Denver and is part of the respected monograph «Russian Actionism 1990-2000»  by the Russian art historian Andrej Kovalev.

In 2000 Mavromatti left Russia and since then he has been living and working in Bulgaria and the US.

On-line Show - a public execution performance "Ally/ Foe” 
During the Summer of 2010 Mavromatti had re-applied for Russian passport at the Russian consulate in Bulgaria. Mavromatti was informed that because in Russia he is being under Federal investigation under the Article 282, for his performance "Do not believe your eyes", his passport cannot be extended.
Realizing that the return to Russia will automatically be followed by trial and definite conviction, Oleg Mavromatti, decided to carry an on-line show (public punishment) under the working title "Ally/ Foe”. Some type of an electric chair will be connected to the Internet via the computer. The vote will go on line. If the votes “against” Mavromatti will prevail over the number of votes "for" him, the computer will generate the signal, which will launch an electric discharge to Mavromatti's body.  He will be physically punished by the ones who want his conviction.

Selected exhibitions, performances 
 2010 — The Cow of Desire, performance together with Boryana Rossa as ULTRAFUTURO, Gallery Plastelin, Sofia.
 2010 — Blood Certificate, together with Boryana Rossa, Exit Art, NY
 2009 — People's Servants, together with Boryana Rossa, Stedelijk Museum, Amsterdam.
 2009 — Vitruvian Body, together with Boryana Rossa, at re.act.feminism exhibition, Akademie der Künste, Berlin
 2009 — Rotte Armie Forever, together with bionihil and Boryana Rossa, in front of the Reichstag, Berlin
 2008 — Bomb, Studio Dauhaus, Sofia.
 2008 — «Anti-Halloween» performance together with Boryana Rossa as ULTRAFUTURO, Tallinn Art Hall, Tallinn.
 2008 — On Air, performance with Boryana Rossa, 8th Biennial August in Art, Varna, Georgi Velchev Museum.
 2008 — For a Handful of Coins, performance, 13th Panchevo Biennial of Art, Pure expression, Serbia and Montenegro.
 2007 — Conspiracy of the Castrates, together with Ultrafuturo, exhibition, Red House Center for Culture and Debate, Sofia.
 2006 — About the Living and the Dead, together with Boryana Rossa, as ULTRAFUTURO, Rencontre internationale d'art performance (RIAP), Quebec City
 2006 — Before and After, together with Boryana Rossa, Exit Art, NY
 2006 — The Trickiest Word, Gallery Praktika, Moscow
 2006 — According to the Text, performance, Dauhaus, Sofia.
 2005 — UNIT 731, Park of Freedom, Sofia
 2005 — ART Digital 2004, 1st Moscow Biennale for Contemporary Arts, MARS Gallery
 2005 — Love me the Way I Love You, performance together with ULTRSFUTURO, Goethe Institute, Sofia
 2004 — Open Source, National Palace of Culture, Sofia
 2004 — Roboriada, Performance with ULTRAFUTURO, Goethe Institute, Sofia
 2003 — Citizen Robot, Irida Gallery, Sofia
 2001 — Uninstall, performance, Gallery XXL, Sofia.
 2000 — Citizen X, performance, Guelman Gallery, Moscow
 2000 — The Great Purge, performance, Sculpture park, Central House of Artists, Moscow.
 2000 — Do Not Kill!, performance, Poklonnaya Hill, Moscow
 2000 — Do Not Believe Your Eyes, institute of Culturology, Moscow.
 1995 — Ending Performance, together with Emperor Wawa,  center for Contemporary Art, Moscow

Filmography

Director 
 2017 — Monkey Ostrich and grave (working title), USA,Belorussia,Bg 2017 (director)
 2015 — No place for fools (working title), USA,Russian 2011 (director)
 2011 — Little Knife Leedaboo (working title), USA, expected Spring, 2011 (director)
 2009 — Blind Spot, USA, 93'
 2005 — ULTRAFUTURO Manifest, BG, 30'
 2002 — The Rats are Leaving the Shop, BG/USA, 50'
 2001 — The Biggest Meatball in the World, BG, 100'
 2000 — Bastards, RU, 120'
 2000 — Oil on Canvas, RU. All footage of the film had been confiscated by the Russian police.
 1997-99 — The Secret Aesthetic of the Martian Spies, 1,2, 3. RU. The master copies had been confiscated by the Russian police.

Producer 
 1999 — The Green Elephant Calf, RU, 86'
 1998 — Кokki the Running Doctor, RU, 80'

Actor 
 2008 — The Juche Idea, 62'
 1998 — Кokki the Running Doctor, RU, 80'

Prizes, awards 
 2005 – Prize for «The Most Sincere Film» at Festival of Radical Film «Stik» Moscow, for the film «Bastards», 1999.
 2000 — Grand-Prix International Independent Film and Video festival Dreamcatcher, Kyiv, Ukraine.

External links 
 Oleg Mavromati blog
 Oleg Mavromati blog (282)

Sources 

Living people
20th-century Russian painters
Russian male painters
21st-century Russian painters
1965 births
Mass media people from Volgograd
20th-century Russian male artists
21st-century Russian male artists